Río Azul is a district of the La Unión canton, in the Cartago province of Costa Rica.

History 
Río Azul was created on 15 July 1968 by Ley 4148. Segregated from San Diego.

Geography 
Río Azul has an area of  km² and an elevation of  metres.

Demographics 

For the 2011 census, Río Azul had a population of  inhabitants.

Transportation

Road transportation 
The district is covered by the following road routes:
 National Route 409

References 

Districts of Cartago Province
Populated places in Cartago Province